Zakon i Pravosudiye is a Russian-language Kazakhstani newspaper based in Almaty. It specializes in law and politics of Kazakhstan and investigating and publicizing government corruption. Several of its journalists have disappeared in mysterious circumstances; among them are Oralgaisha Omarshanova (disappeared March 30, 2007) and Tokbergen Abiyev (disappeared on December 20, 2012).

References

See also
Media of Kazakhstan

Russian-language newspapers published in Kazakhstan
Mass media in Almaty